Carlos Gigena Parker was de facto Federal Interventor of Córdoba, Argentina from 25 February to 2 March 1971.

References

Year of birth missing
Possibly living people
20th-century Argentine people
Governors of Córdoba Province, Argentina
Place of birth missing (living people)